Bana is a genus of robber flies in the family Asilidae, found in southern Africa. There are at least two described species in Bana.

Species
These two species belong to the genus Bana:
 Bana apicida Londt, 1992
 Bana madiba Londt, 2013

References

Further reading

 

Asilidae genera